Thanh Chương is a rural district of Nghệ An province in the North Central Coast region of Vietnam. As of 2018, the district had a population of 271,560. The district covers an area of 1,128 km². The district capital lies at Thanh Chương.

References

Districts of Nghệ An province